Arcomps is a commune in the Cher department in the Centre-Val de Loire region of France.

Geography
The commune is the source of several small tributaries of the Cher.

Population

Places of interest
 The old church of St Martin, now a farm building, dating from the twelfth century.
 The present-day church, dating from the nineteenth century.
 Touratte castle, dating from the thirteenth century.
 An ancient stone cross.

See also
Communes of the Cher department

References

Communes of Cher (department)